Barabai is the capital city of Hulu Sungai Tengah Regency, South Kalimantan, Indonesia. It is located 165km away from Banjarmasin, the capital of the province. The town is at the feet of the Meratus Mountains that runs in a north-south arc on the island of Borneo.

Climate
Barabai has a tropical rainforest climate (Af) with moderate rainfall in August and September and heavy rainfall in the remaining months.

References

Populated places in South Kalimantan
Regency seats of South Kalimantan